Eldredge may refer to 

 Eldredge (automobile), manufactured in Belvidere, Illinois by the National Sewing Machine Company

People
 Alma Eldredge (1841–1925), member of the Utah Territorial Legislature, mayor of Coalville, Utah
 Barnabas Eldredge (died 1911), American founder of the Eldridge Sewing Machine Company and National Sewing Machine Company
 Brett Eldredge (born 1986), American country musician
 Charles Eldredge (disambiguation), several people
 George Eldredge (1898–1977), American actor
 H. Wentworth Eldredge (1909–1991), American sociologist and WWII spy
 Horace S. Eldredge (1816–1888), member of the First Seven Presidents of the Seventy in the Church of Jesus Christ of Latter Day Saints (1854–1888)
 John Eldredge, an American author, counselor, and lecturer of Christianity
 John Eldredge (actor) (1904–1961), American actor
 Hezekiah Eldredge (1795–1845), American architect
 Laurence Howard Eldredge (1902–1982), American lawyer and educator
 Leigh-Anne Eldredge (born 1964), American tennis player
 Nathaniel B. Eldredge (1813–1893), U.S. Representative from Michigan
 Niles Eldredge (born 1943), an American paleontologist
 Todd Eldredge (born 1971), an American figure skater
 W. Jay Eldredge (1913–2002), general superintendent of the Young Men's Mutual Improvement Association (1969–1972)
 Zoeth Skinner Eldredge (1846–1915), American banker and historian

Places
West Cape May, New Jersey, formerly known as Eldredge

See also
 Eldridge (disambiguation)